George Donald Bullard (October 24, 1928 – December 23, 2002) was an American professional baseball player. The native of Lynn, Massachusetts, was a shortstop and outfielder during a nine-season (1950–1958) career. He played 891 games in minor league baseball and received a four-game, end-of-season trial in the Major Leagues with the 1954 Detroit Tigers.

Bullard attended Lynn Classical High School, where he was a teammate of celebrated local athlete and future MLB first baseman Harry Agganis. Bullard was recalled by Detroit after his fifth season in the team's farm system and made his debut as a pinch runner on September 17, 1954, running for Walt Dropo in the ninth inning of a 6–3 loss to the Cleveland Indians. After two more pinch running appearances, Bullard played his only game in the field (at shortstop) and recorded his only plate appearance in MLB on September 25, also against the Indians. He entered the game in the sixth inning. Defensively he handled five chances and made one error. At the plate, he recorded one at bat against Early Wynn, a future Hall of Famer.  He reached first base on a force play and did not score a run.

"I replaced shortstop Harvey Kuenn in the game and I hit the ball hard and got on base," Bullard once said. "It was a big thrill to play. On the Indians that day in Cleveland was my hometown neighbor Jim Hegan, the great Indians catcher. I hurt my hand in the game and was shipped back to Boston for treatment and missed the chance at playing in more games that late September."

Bullard played another four season in the Tigers and Milwaukee Braves organizations before leaving baseball in 1958.

References

External links

1928 births
2002 deaths
Austin Senators players
Baseball players from Massachusetts
Buffalo Bisons (minor league) players
Detroit Tigers players
Durham Bulls players
Little Rock Travelers players
Major League Baseball shortstops
Montgomery Rebels players
Sportspeople from Lynn, Massachusetts
Richmond Tigers players
Topeka Hawks players
Williamsport Grays players
Williamsport Tigers players